The Daily Squib is a British satirical online publication created by satire writer Aur Esenbel, that was officially launched on April Fool's Day, 2007. Its coverage extends across world politics, science, technology, business, sports and health.

Spoofs, humorous takes and social commentary
On 7 February 2008, The Daily Squib published a spoof article in which it was claimed that the Ku Klux Klan had chosen to endorse Barack Obama in the 2008 US Presidential elections in order to avoid the election of Hillary Clinton. The spoof was misinterpreted by some readers as a factual article, and quickly became a widely circulated internet rumour that was discussed in articles by Reuters and The Times (London). An article in the Tampa Bay Times subsequently reported that the Ku Klux Klan had been repeatedly contacted with requests to verify their stance regarding The Daily Squib's story. And in April 2008, American rapper Snoop Dogg re-circulated the rumour generated by the Daily Squib story in an interview with The Guardian.

On 3 February 2009, The Daily Squib published a humorous article satirizing the UK's helpless response to prolonged snowfall in February 2009.  The spoof article claimed that Hitler had planned to use 'snow zeppelins' as weapons of attack in order 'to disrupt Britain's ability to function'.

On 4 August 2010, The Daily Squib published a spoof article detailing the exploits of a masturbating Transportation Security Administration official and a full body X-ray scanner. The satirical story drew considerable attention, such that the TSA ultimately issued a public statement denying that the incident had occurred on their blog.

A Daily Squib story satirizing an interview with former United States Secretary of State, Henry Kissinger first published on 27 November 2011 was cited as a factual story by flagship Egyptian newspaper Al-Ahram, on 16 September 2012. The Daily Squib Kissinger satire, was also mentioned by former John Major era Chancellor of the Exchequer, Norman Lamont on 6 March 2012 in the New Statesman.

On 19 October 2012 a Daily Squib article  which featured a fake EU poster that contained the Soviet hammer and sickle symbol was mistaken for a real EU poster by the Conservative MEP Daniel Hannan.

The Daily Squib editor, Aur Esenbel, was interviewed for award winning magazine, The Big Issue, published on 23 November 2018. The article discussed the variance in fake news and satire. Esenbel elucidated readers about the Daily Squib's literary style: “The tone is Juvenalian satire, that is to say, it is harder hitting than the jolly harmless Horatian kind, which is prevalent in so many other sites.”

Censorship

On 11 July 2017, after ten years online, The Daily Squib satirical article "Ku Klux Klan Endorses Obama" was pulled off the site after Google demanded the article be removed or The Daily Squib would lose its advertising. The editor of The Daily Squib, Aur Esenbel replied citing the "loss of freedom of speech", "censorship of satire", and how Google had "completely misunderstood the premise of the satirical article".

Global creative awards jury

The Daily Squib, was chosen alongside well-known industry journals such as Adweek, Campaign magazine, Creative Review to be one of the jurors with jury president Spencer Baim, Chief Strategic officer at Vice Media for the globally acclaimed 2017 Epica Awards showcasing creativity in advertising, film and design.

PHNX Tribute creative jury

The Daily Squib, Editor, Aur Esenbel, was chosen as a jury member for the 2020, PHNX Tribute., a celebration of individual creatives and teams within the creative industry.

Announcement of The Daily Squib Anthology: From 2007 to 2022 book

On August 21 2022, The Daily Squib, Editor, Aur Esenbel, announced in an article on the website of the publication of the new book. According to the publisher Curtis Press, The Daily Squib Anthology From 2007 to 2022 will be published on Paperback, A4, greyscale, 138 pages on October 1 2022. Quotes from the book's description acknowledge the history of The Daily Squib throughout its 15-year tenure on the internet: "As the follies and absurdities of the powerful are destroying the world through war, pandemic, and climate change, what better time to release The Daily Squib: Anthology from 2007 to 2022? Over the last 15 years, the Squib has held a crazy distorted fairground mirror to global events. Sometimes its spoofs have even been mistaken for real news—what higher accolade is there for a satirist? Its mock report on the Ku Klux Klan declaring its support for Barack Obama in the 2008 US elections and its fake interview with Henry Kissinger (2011) fooled “serious” outlets across the world. More than that, the Squib has somehow become an unholy satirical oracle by predicting an EU army 5 years before anyone else was talking about it and, in 2018, the COVID-19 pandemic, even pinpointing “somewhere in Asia” as the source. Though like lots of other good things this has been overlooked by the mainstream media, the Squib has played an innovative role in shaping internet-based comedy since 2007 and has fought hard for free speech in a climate of increasing puritanism on both the political left and right."

See also
 List of satirical magazines
 List of satirical news websites
 List of satirical television news programs

References

External links
 

Internet properties established in 2007
British satirical websites
2007 establishments in the United Kingdom